Zalán Zombori (born 25 May 1975 in Pécs) is a Hungarian football player.

External links

1975 births
Living people
Hungarian footballers
Hungary international footballers
Hungarian expatriate footballers
Nemzeti Bajnokság I players
Cypriot First Division players
Vasas SC players
Újpest FC players
Fehérvár FC players
Ferencvárosi TC footballers
Alki Larnaca FC players
Budapest Honvéd FC players
Expatriate footballers in Cyprus
Association football midfielders
Sportspeople from Pécs